Asuravithu may refer to:
 Asuravithu (novel), a Malayalam language Indian novel by M. T. Vasudevan Nair
 Asuravithu (1968 film), a Malayalam language adaptation of the novel
 Asuravithu (2012 film), a Malayalam language action film